Barlassina is a comune (municipality) in the Province of Monza and Brianza in the Italian region Lombardy, located about  north of Milan and  south of Como .

References

External links
 Official website

Cities and towns in Lombardy
Populated places on Brianza